Aditi Gautam also credited as Seiya Guatam is an Indian model turned actress known for her works in Telugu and Hindi language films. Aditi made her Telugu cinema debut with the 2008 film Neninthe and Bollywood debut with the 2018 film Sanju.

Filmography

References

External links
 

1996 births
Living people
Kashmiri people
Kashmiri actors
Actresses in Telugu cinema
Actresses in Hindi cinema
Indian female models
Indian film actresses
Actresses from Mumbai
Indian soap opera actresses
Actresses in Hindi television